Lieutenant-Colonel John Manners-Sutton (29 July 1752 – 17 February 1826) was a British soldier and politician who sat in the House of Commons from 1783 to 1796.

Manners-Sutton was the second son of Lord George Manners-Sutton. He joined the Army as an Ensign in the 2nd Foot Guards (Coldstream Guards) in 1768. He was promoted to lieutenant and captain in 1775 and to lieutenant-colonel in 1780. He retired from the army in 1790.

Manners-Sutton was elected Member of Parliament for Newark at a by-election in 1783. He was re-elected in the general elections of 1784 and 1790 sitting until 1796. He succeeded his brother George Manners-Sutton, inheriting Kelham Hall near Newark, Nottinghamshire, and was appointed High Sheriff of Nottinghamshire for 1808–09.

Manners-Sutton married Anne Manners, the illegitimate daughter of John Manners, Marquess of Granby, his first cousin. The couple had six children:
John Manners-Sutton, died unmarried
Robert Manners-Sutton, d. 1815
Rev. Frederick Manners-Sutton (1784 – 30 August 1826), married on 2 September 1821 Lady Henrietta Lumley, daughter of John Lumley-Savile, 7th Earl of Scarbrough and had issue, including John Manners-Sutton.
George Manners-Sutton (d. 13 January 1836), unmarried
Mary Georgiana Manners Sutton (b. 1790, d. 8 November 1846), ancestor of actress Celia Imrie.
Rev. Thomas Manners-Sutton (6 August 1795 – 27 October 1844), married on 23 November 1826 Lucy Mortimer and died without issue

References
 
Manners genealogy

1752 births
1826 deaths
Coldstream Guards officers
Members of the Parliament of Great Britain for English constituencies
J
British MPs 1780–1784
British MPs 1784–1790
British MPs 1790–1796
High Sheriffs of Nottinghamshire